Albert Charles Williams (12 February 1873 – 11 November 1955) was an Australian rules footballer who played with South Melbourne in the Victorian Football League (VFL).

Notes

External links 

1873 births
1955 deaths
Australian rules footballers from Victoria (Australia)
Sydney Swans players
South Ballarat Football Club players